R.W.R McDonald is a New Zealand author, living in Melbourne, Australia best known for his crime novels The Nancys. and Nancy Business

Personal life 
McDonald was born in Balclutha, New Zealand and grew up on a sheep and venison farm in South Otago.

Although he now lives in Melbourne, he maintains strong ties to the region, and set his first novel in Otago. The fictional town of Riverstone in both The Nancys and Nancy Businesswas modelled "somewhat on Balclutha", he said.

McDonald identifies as queer and co-parents two daughters.

Writing career 
R.W.R McDonald wrote the first draft of The Nancys while at Faber Academy, Melbourne under the tutelage of award winning authors Toni Jordan and Paddy O'Reilly.

McDonald credits his tutors and mentors for "talking him off the ledge" halfway through writing The Nancys and "sticking with it" when he was going to pull out of the course and writing due to outside pressures.

In 2017, The Nancys was highly commended in Victorian Premier's Unpublished Manuscript Award, this lead him to signing with literary agent, Grace Heifetz.

In 2019, his debut novel, The Nancys, was published in Australia and New Zealand by Allen and Unwin.

McDonald's second novel in The Nancys series, Nancy Business, was published in June 2021.

McDonald was a contributor to the 2022 crime fiction anthology, Dark Deeds Down Under: A Crime & Thriller Anthology with Nancys Undercover, a short story set one year after The Nancys 

R.W.R McDonald was a judge in the 2022 VPLA Unpublished Awards.

In 2022, R.W.R McDonald signed with children's publisher Larrikin House

The Nancys 
The novel centres around an eleven year old school girl, Tippy Chan and her babysitting Uncle Pike and his boyfriend Devon, who together form a secret amateur detective club "The Nancys" to try and solve Tippy's teacher's murder in her small town over one summer.

Nancy Business 
The sequel to The Nancys. McDonald's second book takes place four months after The Nancys finished. The story begins on the one-year anniversary of Weifang (Joe) Chan's death. The amateur detective trio, made up of Tippy Chan, her Uncle Pike and his boyfriend, Devon, reform after a large explosion rocks Tippy's small hometown of Riverstone, South Otago. The Nancys believe the police have charged the wrong person with the bombing.

Awards and recognition 
• Ngaio Marsh Award, 2020, Best First Novel, Winner for The Nancys

• Victorian Premier's Unpublished Manuscript Award, 2017 Highly commended for The Nancys

• Ngaio Marsh Award, 2020, Best Crime Novel, Finalist for The Nancys

• Ned Kelly Awards, 2020, Best First Novel, Shortlisted for The Nancys

• In June 2021, the Screen options for The Nancys were bought by Hoodlum Entertainment, via Grace Heifetz of Left Bank Literacy Agency.

• Ngaio Marsh Award, 2022, Best Crime Novel, Finalist for Nancy Business

Bibliography 
• The Nancys (2019) 

• Nancy Business (2021) 

• Dark Deeds Down Under: A Crime & Thriller Anthology (2022), Contributor “Nancys Undercover”

References

External links 
 

People from Balclutha, New Zealand
Year of birth missing (living people)
Living people
Writers from Melbourne
New Zealand crime fiction writers
21st-century New Zealand novelists
New Zealand expatriates in Australia
21st-century New Zealand male writers
New Zealand gay writers
New Zealand LGBT novelists
New Zealand male novelists
Australian crime writers
Writers from Victoria (Australia)